
Gmina Dzierzkowice is a rural gmina (administrative district) in Kraśnik County, Lublin Voivodeship, in eastern Poland. Its seat is Dzierzkowice, a location which is divided into several sołectwos.

Villages
Gmina Dzierzkowice contains the villages and settlements of Dębina, Dzierzkowice-Góry, Dzierzkowice-Podwody, Dzierzkowice-Rynek, Dzierzkowice-Wola, Dzierzkowice-Zastawie, Krzywie, Ludmiłówka, Sosnowa Wola, Terpentyna, Wyżnianka, Wyżnianka-Kolonia, Wyżnica and Wyżnica-Kolonia.

Neighbouring gminas
Gmina Dzierzkowice is bordered by the town of Kraśnik and by the gminas of Annopol, Gościeradów, Józefów nad Wisłą, Kraśnik, Trzydnik Duży and Urzędów.

References

Polish official population figures 2006

Dzierzkowice
Kraśnik County